Charles Quinn Hildebrant (October 17, 1864 – March 31, 1953) was a two-term U.S. Representative from Ohio from 1901 to 1905.

Biography 
Born in Wilmington, Ohio, Hildebrant attended the public schools and Ohio State University at Columbus.
He served as clerk of the court of Clinton County in 1890 and reelected in 1893 and 1896.

Hildebrant was elected as a Republican to the Fifty-seventh and Fifty-eighth Congresses (March 4, 1901 – March 3, 1905).
He served as chairman of the Committee on Accounts (Fifty-eighth Congress).
He was an unsuccessful candidate for reelection in 1904 to the Fifty-ninth Congress.
He resumed his business and agricultural pursuits.  
He served as delegate to the Republican National Convention in 1908.
Secretary of state of Ohio 1915–1917.

He served as mayor of Wilmington, Ohio, from November 1927 until his retirement December 31, 1941.
He died in Wilmington, Ohio, March 31, 1953.
He was interred in Sugar Grove Cemetery.

Sources

1864 births
1953 deaths
Mayors of places in Ohio
People from Wilmington, Ohio
Ohio State University alumni
Secretaries of State of Ohio
Republican Party members of the United States House of Representatives from Ohio